Bappi Aparesh Lahiri (born Alokesh Aparesh Lahiri; 27 November 1952 – 15 February 2022), also known as Bappida was an Indian singer, composer and record producer. He popularised the use of synthesised disco music in Indian music industry and sang some of his own compositions.  He was popular in the 1980s and 1990s with filmi soundtracks.  He also delivered major box office successes in Bengali, Telugu, and Kannada films.  His music was well received into the 21st century.

In 1986, he was recognised by Guinness World Records for recording more than 180 songs in one year.

Early life
Alokesh Aparesh Lahiri was born into a Bengali Brahmin family in Calcutta. His parents, Aparesh Lahiri and Bansuri Lahiri, both were Bengali singers and musicians in classical music and Shyama Sangeet who belong to Lahiri Mohan Family of Sirajganj, East Bengal (Now Bangladesh). His parents, were both singers who met while performing for All India Radio. He was their only child. His relatives include singer Kishore Kumar, his maternal uncle.

Bappi Lahiri began to play tabla at the age of 3. Initially, he was trained by his parents. Bappi showed talent as a child playing the tabla and studied with Samta Prasad on the advice of Lata Mangeshkar.

Since childhood, he idolised American musician Elvis Presley, and was inspired by him to wear multiple gold chains and gold jewellery. He thought of creating his own signature appearance when he becomes successful, and later upon becoming successful, he created his signature "golden jewellery" look inspired by that of Presley. He considers gold to be "lucky" for him.

Career

Lahiri came to Mumbai when he was 19. He received his first opportunity in a Bengali film, Daadu (1974), where Lata Mangeshkar sang his composition. The first Hindi film for which he composed music was Nanha Shikari (1973) and his first Hindi composition was Tu Hi Mera Chanda sung by Mukesh. The turning point of his career was Tahir Husain's Hindi film, Zakhmee (1975), for which he composed music and doubled as a playback singer. He composed a duet with Kishore Kumar and Mohammed Rafi named "Nothing Is Impossible", for the same film. His compositions Jalta Hai Jiya Mera (Kishore Asha duet) and Lata Mangeshkar solos like Abhi Abhi Thi Dushmani and Aao Tumhe Chand from the same film became popular and gave him recognition. The duet Phir Janam Lenge Hum sung by Kishore Lata became famous from the film Phir Janam Lengey Hum. All songs from the film Chalte Chalte (1976), became hits, thus bringing him recognition as a music director at the national level. He sang duet with Sulakshana Pandit named Jana Kahan Hai which gave him recognition as singer. Songs from the films like Aap Ki Khatir, Dil Se Mile Dil, Patita, Lahu Ke Do Rang, Hatya and Ravikant Nagaichs Surakksha 1979 had soft music.

He also composed music for some ghazals, namely "Kisi Nazar Ko Tera Intezaar Aaj Bhi Hai" and "Aawaz Di Hai" for the 1985 film Aitbaar. He also composed melodious songs sung by Kishore Kumar either as duets with Asha Bhosle or Lata Mangeshkar in the films starring Rajesh Khanna in the 80's in hit films like Naya Kadam, Masterji, Aaj Ka M.L.A. Ram Avtar, Bewafai, Maqsad, Suraag, Insaaf Main Karoonga and Adhikar. After success of the film Himmatwala, Bappi regularly composed duets sung by Kishore Kumar for films starring Jeetendra like in Justice Chowdhry, Jaani Dost, Mawali, Haisiyat, Tohfa, Balidaan, Qaidi, Hoshiyaar, Sinhasan, Suhaagan, Majaal, Tamasha, Sone Pe Suhaga and Dharm Adhikari.Bappi Lahiri made a record by composing for 12 super-hit silver jubilee movies starring Jetendra as the lead hero in the period 1983–1985. 

He entered the Guinness Book of World Records for recording over 180 songs for 33 films in 1986.

Apart from his popular disco-electronic music, Bappi Lahiri was also known for his signature look of his sartorial style that consisted gold chains, golden embellishments, velvety cardigans and sunglasses.

Portions of Lahiri's song "Thoda Resham Lagta Hai" were included in the 2002 song "Addictive" by American R&B singer Truth Hurts. Copyright holders Saregama India, Ltd. sued Interscope Records and its parent company, Universal Music Group for more than $500 million. A Los Angeles federal judge subsequently barred further sales of the CD unless and until Lahiri was listed on the song's credits.

In 2012, his album World Peace, Love & Harmony was among the top five albums being considered for a Grammy nomination but got lost. But, he was selected to be a jury member in the Grammy Awards.

In late 2016, Lahiri voiced the character of Tamatoa in the Hindi-dubbed version of Disney's 3D computer-animated fantasy adventure film Moana; he also composed and sang "Shona" (Gold), the Hindi version of "Shiny". This was his first time dubbing for an animated character, and he also appeared in Ramratan song "Yeh Hai Dance Bar". He won Filmfare Lifetime Achievement Award at 63rd Filmfare Awards.

In 2021, he appeared as a guest judge in musical TV shows such as Sa Re Ga Ma Pa, and Indian Idol.

Political ambitions
Bappi Lahiri joined the Bharatiya Janata Party on 31 January 2014 in the presence of Rajnath Singh, the then-national President of Bharatiya Janata Party, to contest the 2014 Lok Sabha election. He was made a BJP candidate from Srerampur (Lok Sabha constituency) in 2014, but lost to Kalyan Banerjee.

Other work

Acting

Dubbing

Death 
Bappi Lahiri died of obstructive sleep apnea in Mumbai, on 15 February 2022 at the age of 69.

Politicians including Prime Minister Narendra Modi, cabinet minister Smriti Irani, West Bengal Chief Minister Mamata Banerjee,  expressed their condolences to Lahiri. Akshay Kumar, Ajay Devgan, Chiranjeevi, K.S.Chithra, Shreya Ghoshal, Vishal Dadlani, Himesh Reshammiya and others also expressed their condolences.

Discography

Bappi Lahiri became popular in the late 1970s-80s and early 1990s for the film soundtracks composed by him such as Naya Kadam, Aangan Ki Kali, Wardat, Disco Dancer, Haathkadi (1982 film), Namak Halaal, Masterji, Dance Dance, Himmatwala, Justice Chaudhury, Tohfa, Maqsad, Commando, Naukar Biwi Ka, Adhikar and Sharaabi. 

He was known for disco-style songs where he brought orchestration and fusion of Indian music with international sounds and youthful upbeat rhythms. Although most of his songs were written for discotheques and dance numbers, there are several melodious songs as well from a list of movies like Chalte Chalte, Zakhmee, Aangan Ki Kali, Patita, Adhikar, Aaj Ka M.L.A Ram Avatar, Laalchi, Aitbaar, Naya Kadam.

Hindi and Bengali

Telugu

Tamil 
Apoorva Sahodarigal (1983)
Paadum Vaanampadi (1985)
Kizhakku Africavil Sheela (1987)

Kannada 
Gangvaa (1984)
Africadalli Sheela (1986)
Krishna Nee Begane Baro (1986)
Guru (1989)
Police Matthu Dada (1991)
Love in Mandya (2014) – singer, "Current Hodha Timealli"

Other languages 

Janam Janam Na Saath (1977) – Gujarati
Dokyala Taap Nahi (1990) – Marathi
The Good Boys (1997) – Malayalam
Luckee (2019) – Marathi, singer

Awards

Honours

 2017 – Banga Bhushan Civilian Honour by Government of West Bengal

Legacy
Composer Bappi Lahiri's discarded disco track Zindagi Meri Dance Dance was left out of the Babbar Subhash film Dance Dance although it featured on the vinyl album release at the time. It was re-discovered and had a second lease of life in director Ashim Ahluwalia's 2017 gangster film Daddy starring Arjun Rampal. The re-release of the song was a huge success, becoming one of the top tracks of the year.

Ahluwalia wanted an authentic 80s Bappi Lahiri sound and not an overproduced remix. Norwegian producer Olefonken reworked the song to be more dynamic for contemporary sound systems but kept many of the original elements including the original vocals of Alisha Chinai and Vijay Benedict as well as the original synth and drum machines. The choreographer of Ahluwalia's first film Miss Lovely, was ironically Kamal Nath, who had also worked on B. Subhash's disco film Dance Dance and Commando starring Mithun Chakraborty, both of which feature Bappi Lahiri soundtracks.

See also 
 List of Indian film music directors

==References==

External links

 

 
1952 births
2022 deaths
Filmfare Awards winners
Filmfare Lifetime Achievement Award winners
Musicians from Kolkata
Bengali musicians
National Democratic Alliance candidates in the 2014 Indian general election
Bharatiya Janata Party politicians from West Bengal
20th-century Indian composers
Bengali film score composers
Telugu film score composers
Kannada film score composers
21st-century Indian composers
Hindi film score composers